Venus Verticordia ("the changer of hearts") was an epithet of the Roman goddess Venus, alluding to the goddess' ability to change hearts from lust to chastity.

In the year 114 BC, three Vestal Virgins were condemned to death for transgressing with Roman knights the rigid law against sexual intercourse. To atone for their misdeeds, a shrine was dedicated to Venus Verticordia in the hope that she would turn the hearts of women and girls against licentiousness and towards chastity.  Hence her name Verticordia, which means 'turner of hearts'. Under this title she was especially worshipped by married women, and on 1 April the Veneralia festival was celebrated in her honor.

According to Valerius Maximus, a Roman woman named Sulpicia was chosen by the vote of ten, drawn by lot from a pool of one hundred who had been chosen by the women of Rome as a body to dedicate a statue of Venus Verticordia. Sulpicia was deemed the chastest woman in Rome, and the method of selection was prescribed by the Sibylline Books.

Two foundation legends provided a frame of references for the perception of the Cult of Venus Verticordia in ancient times. Sometime in the late third century BCE, a statue was dedicated to Venus Verticordia by the chastest matron in Rome, in this case Sulpicia, daughter of Servius Sulpicius and wife of Fulvius Flaccus. The Sibylline Books had prescribed the dedication as a cure for the prevailing licentiousness of women. The hope was that matrons and unmarried girls would more readily turn from licentiousness to chastity. The second legend was connected with the dedication of a temple to Venus Verticordia in 114 BC. A Roman knight and his virgin daughter were returning to Apulia from the Roman games when the girl was struck by lightning and killed. Her tunic was pulled up to her waist, her tongue protruded and the trappings of her horse were scattered around her.

This dreadful prodigy was interpreted as meaning that the three Vestal Virgins had been guilty of unchaste conduct, in which many members of the equestrian class were implicated. All the offenders, both male and female, were duly punished and a temple was then built to Venus Verticordia. According to both Ovid and Valerius Maximus, the temple and statue that respectively figured in each story were offered to the goddess in the hope that the maiden would correct the wanton ways of women and make them chaste. This, said Ovid, was the explanation of the cult title itself: "Verticordia, Changer of Hearts."

Each legend dealt with a separate aspect of the cult, the dedication of the statue and the dedication of the temple; each also dealt with the areas of controlling female sexual morality which had different implications for the collective welfare of the Roman State. There was much more at stake in the virginity of a Vestal Virgin that in the pudicitia of a matrona. But the two stories are none the less complementary rather than competing perceptions of the cult. They are both characterized by an extraordinary level of exaggeration: hyperbole is a common feature of both stories. Consider for example the concept of the chastest matron. One is either chaste or unchaste. The Vestals ruled and accounted for all the monies of Rome and thus these women had to undergo the tightest of control of all women in Rome.

References

Virgin goddesses
Venus (mythology)